Sarpa Facula is a bright region on the surface of Mercury, located at 53.07° S, 30.87° W.  It was named by the IAU in 2019.  Sarpa is the Sinhalese word for snake.

Sarpa Facula is north of Ular Facula and southeast of Havu Facula and Bitin Facula.

References

Surface features of Mercury